The Wyoming Cowboy Hall of Fame is a cowboy hall of fame. Established in 2013, the Wyoming Cowboy Hall of Fame exists to enrich Wyoming's cowboy and ranch heritage through various means as it sees fit. Its main purpose in doing this is to recognize individuals in the state who established the first trails and brought this culture here.

History 
The inaugural class of inductees ceremony took place in Douglas, Wyoming, in the year 2014, the year the hall opened its doors. More than 500 people attended the event. Senator Mike Enzi, along with the Board of Directors, performed the induction procedure. "This event was really about celebrating the first class of individuals inducted into the Wyoming Cowboy Hall of Fame,” said Scott Ratliff, president of the Board. “It is about recognizing what cowboys stand for." Individuals inducted into the inaugural class included both living and non-living people. The hall of fame allows the board to recognize cowboys who might not otherwise be remembered. The hall of fame is an organization that took 15 years in the making. And as of yet, it only exists as a virtual museum.

Inductees

2019 Inductees
 Arthur "Art" Bales
 Jesse "Jess" Barkhurst
 Robert "Bob" Beard
 Wells Beck
 Harry Aaron Borgialli
 Tom Borgialli
 William "Bill" Carr
 Joe Coykendall
 C.W. "Chuck" & Dick Curtis
 A. Wright Dickinson III
 Jack Finnerty
 William "Bill" Frank Sr. & William "Billy" Frank Jr.
 Joseph Brutus "Joe" Graham
 William "Bill" Hancock
 Glenn E Hanson
 Albert William "Bud" Huseman
 Rulan & Loal Jacobson
 Roy Jarrard
 Lora Reynolds Johnson
 Archie "Arch" Johnson
 Dan Kirkbride
 Bruce Laird
 Jerry Lanchbury
 Jeffery "Nate" & Jim Lupher
 Earl Marsh
 Peter McCulloch
 Gerald McInerney
 Paul "Blinky" Hamilton Miller
 Eugene Paul "Gene" Pearson Sr.
 Carlton Perry
 Georgia Platt
 James "Jim" Ramsay & Wanda Ramsay Walker
 Dale Robbins
 Norman Sanford
 Tom Schutte
 Warren Richard "Dick" Shaw
 William Elmer "Billy" Sherman
 Raymond "Ray" Smith
 Hugh & Mary Vass
 Gary Walker
 Byron E. Wollen
Source:

2018 Inductees
 Leland Ward “Buck” Alameda
 Lawrence Atkinson
 B.B. Brooks/McCleary Family
 Kenny “KB” Ballard
 Bernard “Bear Tracks” Betz
 John “Charley” Borgialli
 John E. “Jack” Brodie
 Joseph “Joe” Black Chrisman
 Charlie “Chaz” Cook
 Oley Darlington
 Albert Jerome “Stub” Farlow
 John “Jack” Fitzhugh
 Afton D. “Babe” Green Jr.
 Gene Griffis
 Curtis “Ray” Hammond
 Earl Hardeman
 Harold Harvey
 Mike Henry
 Joe Hickey
 Richard Duane “Dick” Jarrard
 Carl Johnson
 Lonnie “Nav” Mantle
 John “Mexican John” Marroquin
 Frank Lee Martinez
 Morris McCarty
 Eldon “Pete” McKee
 Charles Powers “Charley” Noble
 Francis “Bud” Orton
 Stanley “Henry” Pennoyer
 Harry Harriman (H.H.) “Jim” Price
 Louis “Louie” Rankine
 Clark Leroy “Clarkie” Reynolds
 Donald “Donny” Robbins
 Donald K. “Bill” Scott
 Charles “Charlie” Shaffer
 Frank Shepperson
 Stewart “Sturdy” Sides Jr.
 Sidney Ross “Sid” Skiver
 Harold “Smitty” Smith
 Ronald “Ron” Stoltenberg
 Mary A. “Mickey” Thoman
 Raymond “Ray” Waliser
 Elbert and Hazel Walker
 John Norman Wallingford
 Wales Wenburg
 William C. “Chuck” Wilkinson
 Jesse York
Source:

2017 Inductees
 James “Jim” Atkinson
 Richard T. “Bucky” Barnette
 James “Bill” Beard
 Don “Reckless Red” Bell
 Louis D. “Louie” Boles
 Ernest Nathan “Nate” Brown
 Joe W. “J.W.” Buckhaults
 Murray Butler
 Donald “Dee” Clark
 John G. “Jack” Corbett
 Carl Obe Dockery
 Charles Dunning
 Edwin “Eddie” Dvarishkis
 Percy Edwards
 Church Hill Firnekas
 Joseph Stephen “Joe” Fordyce
 George Earl “Rasty” Givens
 Jack Graves
 William Shaw “Bill” Gray
 William “Bill” Greer
 Jimmie & Gloria Grieve
 Robert “Bob” Isenberger
 Albert D. “Bert” Johnson
 Dail Knori
 Frank “Judge” Lilley
 Robert “Bob” Lozier
 Abner Luman
 Hugh “Hughie” Maller
 Lewis “Junior” Martin
 J. William “Bill” Martin
 Walter C. “Buster” McIlvain
 Cecil Vaughn McMillin
 James Oscar “Jim” Middleton
 James Henry “Hank” Miles
 Otto Arthur Herman Miller
 Arthur Lesie “Art” Montgomery
 Howard Paul “Red” Peterson
 Ray Duane Rice
 Benjamin “Ben” Roberts
 Alden C. Robinson
 Harold Scott
 Floyd “Hawk” Shaffer
 Robert L. “Bob” Snyder
 Wes Taylor
 George Donald “Powder River” Thompson
 Billy Wilkinson
Source:

2016 Inductees
 William C. "Bill" Brewer
 Robert "Bob" Brislawn
 Max Burch
 Ralph Joseph "Joe" Campbell
 Charles "Chipper" Chatfield
 James H. “Jim” Cheney
 Robert “Bob” DeVeny
 Robert Bertram “Bob” Dixon
 John “Swede” Ellis
 Merrill Farthing
 Walter “Walt” Feuz
 John W. “Johnny” Greet
 Rob Roy McGregor Hamilton
 Robert “Bert” Harvey
 Eugene Hickey
 Mary Frances Tisdale “Mike” Hinckley
 Jelmer Edward Johnson
 Frank & Ernest Johnson
 Alex “Junior” Johnstone, Jr.
 Cherry Jones
 John Keller
 Randall “Randy” Kruger
 Robert Lester “Bob” Leath
 Ernest Leitner
 Leondro “Lee” Martinez
 Dub McQueen
 Ira & Edna McWilliams
 John “Jay” Moody
 Walter “Spud” Murphy
 James “Jim” Nelson
 James John “Jim” Ogg
 Luther Lurton “Lute” Penfield
 Calvin Dee Potter, Sr.
 Jack Reisch
 Thomas Anthony “Tuff” Renner
 Norm Richie
 Murl Jay Robbins
 Frank Benjamin “Wild Horse” Robbins
 Willis “Bill” Ruby
 John S. “Jack” Runner
 Stanford “Stan” Sanford
 Charles A. “Chuck” Sanger
 Carl Schweighart
 Roscoe Newton “Peach” Shaw
 John H. “Jack” Simpson
 Christy Knut Smith
 James “Jim” Stoll
 John C. “Johnny” Streeter
 John & Juanita “Neats” Sussex
 Eugene (Gene) “Curly” Williams* 
Source:

2015 Inductees
 Martin "Mart" Aimone
 James “Buck” Allemand
 John Bell
 Charles Alexander Blackstone
 Lloyd Cain
 Earl F. “Earlie” Camblin
 Roger Joe “Rog” Claytor
 Charles Powell “Powd” Clemmons
 William B. “Bill” Coy
 Robert L. Crisp
 George Harry Cross
 Honey DeFord
 Elza “Elzy” Eversole
 Rogelio “Roger” Fernandez
 Gary Lee Frank
 Robert Marshall “Bob” Gibbs
 Norris Graves
 Bill & Billie Hackett
 Lyman A. Harmon
 George Hereford
 Ivan “Ike” Herold
 Robert Garnet “Bob” Hladky
 Charles “Harold” Jarrard
 Dennis “Denny” Jones
 Charles P. “Chas” Kane
 Francis A. Kolego
 William H. “Bill” Kruse
 H. Curtis & Ralph C. Larsen
 Roy Elsworth Martin
 Irma Williams Hancock McGuire
 Bill McKee
 James I. Newland
 Gerald LeRoy “Perk” Perkins
 Burl Potter
 William “4W Bill” Pressler
 Charles R. Rankin
 James Newell “Jimmie” Robbins
 William Dale “Bill” Saunders
 Ralph Schuppan
 Alfred F. “Al” Scoon
 William A. “Bill” Scoon
 Leonard Thompson “Bus” Sedgwick
 Eddie & Peggy Shaffer
 Laddie Guy “Lad” Smith
 Harve H. “Slim” Stone
 William Byron “By” Titensor
 Glen T. Wadsworth
 Leonard “Len” Walker
 John Mercer Weintz
 Charles J. “Chuck” Williams
 Darrell Winfield
 Source:

2014 Inductees
 Tim Barkhurst
 Billie Jean Shepperson Beaton
 Paul Bruegman
 Edwin Earl “Cam” Camblin
 Frank N. "Fearless" Carroll
 Nate Champion
 John Charles “Jack” Esau
 Charles A. “Chuck” Fenton
 John Robert “Cub” Forbes
 Ron Garretson
 Les Gore
 Robert Mills “Bob” Grant
 James Clay “Jim” Hageman
 Jack Hickey
 Guy Holt
 Richard Quay “Dick” Hornbuckle
 Raymond D. Hutson
 James Edward “Jamis” Johnson
 William B. “Will” Jones
 Robert W. “Bob” Manning
 Joseph Michael Maycock
 Ben C. “Benny” Reynolds
 Charles “Ellis” Reynolds
 Frank Rhodes
 J. Ralph “Scotty” Scott
 Anthony Wilkinson “Andy” Sedgwick
 Bill “Cody Bill” Smith
 Howard Wesley “Jack” Sipe, Sr.
 Rhea “Bud” Tillard
 Joseph “Rex” Wardell
 Cecil “Ray” Weber
 Slim Whitt
 Wilkson Brothers - Anthony & John
Source:

References

External links 
 Official Website

2013 establishments in Wyoming
Cowboy halls of fame
Halls of fame in Wyoming
Sports halls of fame
Sports hall of fame inductees
Awards established in 2013
Museums established in 2013
Lists of sports awards